Lester E. Lane (March 6, 1932 – September 5, 1973) was an American basketball player who competed in the 1960 Summer Olympics.  

Lane was born in Purcell, Oklahoma, which after his death, renamed Fourth street south of Main Street in his honor, as "Lester Lane.  He was drafted by the Philadelphia Warriors in the 9th round of the 1955 NBA Draft, but never played for them, instead playing for several AAU clubs, including the Wichita Vickers and Denver-Chicago Truckers.  " He was part of the American basketball team, which won the gold medal in 1960. In the spring of 1973 he was named head basketball coach at the University of Oklahoma, but never held a practice as he died of a heart attack during a pick-up game later that year.

Lane was the head coach for the Mexico men's national basketball team led by Carlos Quintanar in the 1968 Summer Olympics

External links

1932 births
1973 deaths
Amateur Athletic Union men's basketball players
Basketball players at the 1960 Summer Olympics
Medalists at the 1960 Summer Olympics
Oklahoma Sooners men's basketball players
Olympic gold medalists for the United States in basketball
People from Purcell, Oklahoma
Philadelphia Warriors draft picks
United States men's national basketball team players
American men's basketball players
Guards (basketball)